Howard Andrew (1934 – January 13, 2021) was an American poker player, best known for his success at the 1976 World Series of Poker (WSOP). He participated in the WSOP Main Event each year from 1974 until his death, the longest such streak of any player.

Andrew won "both The Horseshoe's Businessmen's and Preliminary Hold-Em tournaments in 1976", earning him two bracelets in consecutive days.  The 1978 WSOP Media Guide called him "one of the World Series of Poker's most formidable non-pros ... an industrial engineer ... [with] a daredevil reputation. If an award were given out to the player who shoved all his chips to the center of the pot most often, he'd probably win it."

Andrew finished in the money in other events at the WSOP, including an 8th-place finish at the 1984 World Series of Poker main event, which earned him $26,400, the same share won by 7th-place finisher Mike Allen and 9th-place finisher Rusty La Page.

Andrew died on January 13, 2021. At the time of his death, his live tournament winnings exceeded $1,500,000.

World Series of Poker bracelets

References

1934 births
2021 deaths
American poker players
World Series of Poker bracelet winners
Super Bowl of Poker event winners